"My My My" is a song by American producer and DJ Armand Van Helden. The song contains a sample of the song "Comin' Apart" by Gary Wright. The track was produced in 2004 and included on the album Nympho. When released as a single, it became a top-ten success in Australia, Flemish Belgium, Denmark and Norway, while reaching number 15 on the UK Singles Chart. An alternative version of "My My My", stylized as "MyMyMy" and featuring vocals from Tara McDonald, was released in 2006 and peaked at number 12 in the United Kingdom, three places above the original. It was also more successful than the original in Ireland, reaching number 25 compared to the original's peak of number 36. My My My" featuring Tara McDonald, which reached number 4 on the world internet charts, number 5 in the Belgian and Dutch charts, number 6 in Australia, number 12 in the UK, and top 30 in the world dance charts.

Music video
The music video features a dream sequence of a geeky man (Beeny Royston), who is sunbathing on the beach wearing a raincoat and orange speedos. He spots a young woman in her bikini in a beach house behind him, and she invites him into the house, into an all-girls' party. Many shots and the setting resemble Aphex Twin's Windowlicker video. At the end of the video the viewer finds out that he was daydreaming and that when he appeared to be kissing a girl he was actually kissing his dog.

The same beach house was used for the Bear Hug video by The 2 Bears.

Charts

Weekly charts

Year-end charts

Certifications

Release history

References

2004 singles
2004 songs
2006 singles
Armand Van Helden songs
Songs with lyrics by Cynthia Weil
Songs written by Armand Van Helden
Songs written by Barry Mann
Songs written by Gary Wright
Tara McDonald songs
UK Independent Singles Chart number-one singles